Alexander Joseph Yunevich (December 8, 1909 – January 28, 1992) was an American football player and coach.  He served as the head football coach at Central State Teachers College—now known as Central Michigan University—from 1934 to 1936 and at Alfred University from 1937 to 1976, compiling a career college football record of 186–98–13.  Yunevich played football as a fullback at Purdue University.  He died on January 28, 1992, in Venice, Florida, where he lived during his retirement.

Head coaching record

Football

References

External links
 

1909 births
1992 deaths
American football fullbacks
Alfred Saxons football coaches
Central Michigan Chippewas baseball coaches
Central Michigan Chippewas football coaches
Lehigh Mountain Hawks football coaches
Purdue Boilermakers football players